Señora Carrar's Rifles is a one-act play by the twentieth-century German dramatist Bertolt Brecht, written in collaboration with Margarete Steffin. It is a modern version of the Irish dramatist John Millington Synge's play Riders to the Sea (1904). The play's setting is re-located to Spain during the height of the Civil War. Teresa Carrar, the mother, wants to protect her children but ends up fighting on the side of the oppressed. Brecht wrote it in 1937 and it received its first theatrical production in the same year, opening in Paris on 16 October. This production was directed by Slatan Dudow and Helene Weigel played Señora Carrar.

See also
 List of German plays

References

Works cited
 Willett, John. 1967. The Theatre of Bertolt Brecht: A Study from Eight Aspects. Third ed. London: Methuen. .

1937 plays
Plays by Bertolt Brecht